Highway M14 is a Ukrainian international highway (M-highway) connecting Odesa to the Russian border east of Mariupol, where it continues into Russia as the A280.

General overview
The M14 is a major transnational corridor and along with the M16 combines into the southern branch of European route E58 in Ukraine (another one in Zakarpattia). The highway is also part of the Eurasian transportation corridor and the Black-Sea Economic Association transportation corridor (ChES). It runs along the coastal line of Black and Azov seas, connecting two major ports of Ukraine in Odesa and Mariupol. The M14 connects two major European routes: E95 and E105.

Main Route

Main route and connections to/intersections with other highways in Ukraine.

See also

 Roads in Ukraine
 Ukraine Highways
 International E-road network
 Pan-European corridors

References

External links
 International Roads in Ukraine in Russian
 European Roads in Russian

Roads in Donetsk Oblast
Roads in Kherson Oblast
Roads in Mykolaiv Oblast
Roads in Odesa Oblast
Roads in Zaporizhzhia Oblast